The Flight of the Phoenix is a 1965 American survival drama film produced and directed by Robert Aldrich, based on the 1964 novel of the same name by English author Elleston Trevor. The story follows a small group of men struggling to survive their aircraft's emergency landing in the Sahara. It stars an ensemble cast, with James Stewart, Richard Attenborough, Peter Finch, Hardy Kruger, Ernest Borgnine, Ian Bannen, Ronald Fraser, Christian Marquand, Dan Duryea and George Kennedy.

Though the film was not a financial success, it was well-received by critics, who praised Aldrich’s direction and the performances of its cast. It was nominated for two Academy Awards: Best Supporting Actor for Bannen and Best Editing for Michael Luciano. Hardy Krüger was nominated for a Golden Globe Award for Best Supporting Actor, and Aldrich was nominated for Best Motion Picture – Drama.

The Flight of the Phoenix was remade in 2004, titled as Flight of the Phoenix.

Plot
Frank Towns is the pilot of a twin-engine Fairchild C-82 Packet cargo plane flying from Jaghbub to Benghazi in Libya; Lew Moran is the navigator. Passengers include Capt. Harris and Sgt. Watson of the British Army; Dr. Renaud, a French physician; Heinrich Dorfmann, a German aeronautical engineer; and an oil company accountant named Standish. There are also several oil workers, including Trucker Cobb, a foreman suffering from mental fatigue; Ratbags Crow, a cocky Scot; Carlos and his pet monkey; and Gabriele.

A sudden sandstorm disables the engines, forcing Towns to crash-land in the Sahara desert. As the aircraft comes to a stop, two workers are killed and Gabriele's leg is severely injured.

The radio is unusable, and the survivors are too far off course to be found by searchers. Aboard the plane is a large quantity of pitted dates but only enough water for ten to fifteen days if rationed. Captain Harris sets out to try and find an oasis. When Sgt. Watson feigns an injury to stay behind, Carlos volunteers, leaving his pet monkey with Bellamy. Harris and Towns refuse to allow the mentally-unstable Cobb to go along, but Cobb defiantly follows anyway and later dies of exposure in the desert. Days later, Harris returns to the crash site alone and barely alive. Sgt. Watson discovers and then ignores him, though others later find him.

Meanwhile, Dorfmann proposes a radical idea: building a new aircraft from the wreckage. The C-82 has twin booms extending rearwards from each engine and connected by the horizontal stabilizer. Dorfmann wants to attach the outer sections of both wings to the left engine and left boom, discarding the center fuselage and both inner wing sections of the aircraft. The men will ride atop the wings. Towns and Moran believe he is either joking or delusional. The argument is complicated by a personality clash between Towns, a proud traditionalist aviator who flew for the Allied Forces during the Second World War, and Dorfmann, a young, arrogant German engineer. Moran struggles to maintain the peace.

Towns initially resists Dorfmann's plan, though Renaud sways his opinion, saying activity and hope will help sustain the men's morale. Dorfmann supervises the reconstruction, while Towns remains skeptical. During the work, the fatally-injured Gabriele commits suicide, depressing the men to where they consider abandoning the new plane's construction. Dorfmann, caught exceeding his water ration, justifies it, saying he has been the only one working continuously. He promises to not do it again but demands everyone work equally hard from then on.

Standish christens the nearly completed aircraft, "Phoenix", after the mythical bird that is reborn from its own ashes. When a band of Arabs camp nearby, Harris and Renaud leave to make contact while the others (and the aircraft) remain hidden. The two men are found murdered the next day. Additionally, Towns and Moran are stunned to learn that Dorfmann designs model airplanes rather than full-sized aircraft. Dorfmann defends himself, claiming the aerodynamic principles are the same, and many model planes require more exacting designs than full-size aircraft. With no other choice, Towns and Moran forge ahead with the plan without telling the others about Dorfmann.

The Phoenix is completed but untested. Only seven starter cartridges are available to ignite the engine. The first four startup attempts are unsuccessful. Over Dorfmann's vehement objections, Towns fires the fifth cartridge with the ignition off to clear the engine's cylinders. The next startup is successful. The men pull the Phoenix to a nearby hilltop, then climb onto the wings. When Towns guns the engine, the Phoenix slides down the hill and over a lake bed before taking off. After a successful landing at an oasis with a manned oil rig, the men celebrate and Towns and Dorfmann are reconciled.

Cast

Song
The Phoenix Love Theme "Senza Fine" sung by Connie Francis
Music & Italian lyrics by Gino Paoli
English lyrics by Alec Wilder

Production

Locations
Principal photography started April 26, 1965, at the 20th Century-Fox Studios and 20th Century-Fox Ranch, California. Other filming locations, simulating the desert, were Buttercup Valley in the Algodones Dunes, California and Pilot Knob Mesa, California. The flying sequences were all filmed at Pilot Knob Mesa near Winterhaven, located in California's Imperial Valley, on the western fringes of Yuma, Arizona.

Aircraft used

In 2005, Hollywood aviation historian Simon Beck identified the aircraft used in the film:
 Fairchild C-82A Packet, N6887C – flying shots.
 Fairchild C-82A Packet, N4833V – outdoor location wreck.
 Fairchild C-82A Packet, N53228 – indoor studio wreck.
 Fairchild R4Q-1 Flying Boxcar (the USMC C-119C variant), BuNo. 126580 – non-flying Phoenix prop.
 Tallmantz Phoenix P-1, N93082 – flying Phoenix aircraft.
 North American O-47A, N4725V – second flying Phoenix.

The C-82As were from Steward-Davies Inc. at Long Beach, California, while the O-47A came from the Planes of Fame air museum in California. The R4Q-1 was purchased from Allied Aircraft of Phoenix, Arizona. The aerial camera platform was a B-25J Mitchell, N1042B, which was also used in the 1970 film Catch-22.

Although principal photography was completed on August 13, 1965, in order to complete filming, a North American O-47A (N4725V) from the Planes of Fame Air Museum in Chino, California was modified and used as a flying Phoenix stand-in. With the canopy removed, a set of skids attached to the main landing gear as well as ventral fin added to the tail, it sufficed as more-or-less a visual lookalike. Filming using the O-47A was completed in October/November 1965. It appears in the last flying scenes, painted to look like the earlier Phoenix P-1.

The final production used a mix of footage that included the O-47A, the "cobbled-together" Phoenix and Phoenix P-1.

Death of stunt flyer Paul Mantz
The flying sequences were flown by famous racing/stunt/movie pilot and collector of warplanes Paul Mantz, co-owner of Tallmantz Aviation, filling in for his partner Frank Tallman, who had injured his leg.

On the morning of July 8, 1965, Mantz was flying the Tallmantz Phoenix P-1, the machine that was "made of the wreckage", performing touch-and-go landings for the cameras, when the fuselage buckled during a touchdown. The movie model broke apart and cartwheeled, killing Mantz and seriously injuring stuntman Bobby Rose.

The final credit on the screen was, "It should be remembered... that Paul Mantz, a fine man and a brilliant flyer gave his life in the making of this film..."

Reception
The film opened in selected theaters on December 15, 1965, with a full release in 1966. Bosley Crowther of The New York Times dismissed it as "grim and implausible", while Variety praised the film as an "often-fascinating and superlative piece of filmmaking highlighted by standout performances and touches that show producer-director at his best."

Box office
Aldrich says the film previewed well and everyone thought it was going to be a big hit but "it never took off" commercially. According to Fox records, the film needed to earn $10,800,000 in rentals to break even, but suffered a loss after only making $4,855,000.

Awards and nominations

See also 
 Flight of the Phoenix (2004 film), a re-make of this film
 List of film accidents
 Lady Be Good (aircraft) and Tragedy at Kufra, real life early air crashes in Africa.

Notes

References

Further reading
 Cox, Stephen. It's a Wonderful Life: A Memory Book. Nashville, Tennessee: Cumberland House, 2003. .
 Eliot, Mark. Jimmy Stewart: A Biography. New York: Random House, 2006. .
 Hardwick, Jack and Ed Schnepf. "A Viewer's Guide to Aviation Movies". The Making of the Great Aviation Films. General Aviation Series, Volume 2, 1989.
 Jones, Ken D., Arthur F. McClure and Alfred E. Twomey. The Films of James Stewart. New York: Castle Books, 1970.
 Munn, Michael. Jimmy Stewart: The Truth Behind the Legend. Fort Lee, New Jersey: Barricade Books Inc., 2006. .
 Pickard, Roy. Jimmy Stewart: A Life in Film. New York: St. Martin's Press, 1992. .
 Robbins, Jhan. Everybody's Man: A Biography of Jimmy Stewart. New York: G.P. Putnam's Sons, 1985. .
 Thomas, Tony. A Wonderful Life: The Films and Career of James Stewart. Secaucus, New Jersey: Citadel Press, 1988. .

External links
 
 
 
 The Jimmy Stewart Museum Home Page
 
 

20th Century Fox films
1965 films
1960s disaster films
1960s adventure drama films
American adventure drama films
American aviation films
American disaster films
Films scored by Frank De Vol
Films about aviation accidents or incidents
Films based on British novels
Films directed by Robert Aldrich
Films set in deserts
Films set in Libya
Films set on airplanes
Films shot in Arizona
Films shot in California
American survival films
1965 drama films
1960s English-language films
1960s American films
Films set in the Sahara